The 2022–23 Azerbaijan Premier League is the 31st season of the Azerbaijan Premier League, the highest tier football league of Azerbaijan. The season will begin on 6 August 2022.

Teams

Stadia and locations
Note: Table lists in alphabetical order.

Stadiums

Personnel and kits

Note: Flags indicate national team as has been defined under FIFA eligibility rules. Players and Managers may hold more than one non-FIFA nationality.

Managerial changes

Foreign players
Each team can use only seven foreign players on the field in each game.

In bold: Players that have been capped for their national team.

League table

Fixtures and results
Clubs played each other four times for a total of 36 matches each.

Matches 1–18

Matches 19–36

Season statistics

Top scorers

Hat-tricks

 4 Player scored 4 goals

Top assists

Clean sheets

See also
 Azerbaijan Premier League
 Azerbaijan First Division
 Azerbaijan Cup

References

External links
UEFA

2022–23 in European association football leagues
2022-23
1